The Izdrevaya is a small river in Novosibirsk Oblast, Russia. Its length is 27 km (17 mi). The river is a right tributary of the Inya.

The tributaries of the river: Ipotinka, Smorodinka, Mostovka, Tokalikha, Malaya Izdrevaya rivers etc.

By the Izdrevaya lies the settlements of Zherebtsovo, Gusiny Brod and Komarovka.

Fauna
Since 2012, volunteers have been breeding Ural owl in the Izdrevaya basin.

During 2012–2016, 8 species of Falconiformes were identified in the Izdrevaya River Basin (nesting was established for 4 species), 3 species of owls were also identified (nesting was created for two species).

Gallery

References

Rivers of Novosibirsk Oblast